The Katering Show is an Australian comedy series. It is a parody of cooking shows and current food trends. It stars Australian comedians Kate McCartney and Kate McLennan. It is "the journey of a food intolerant (McCartney) and an intolerable foodie (McLennan)".

Episodes

Season 1
Season 1 was released direct to YouTube via the Lead Balloon TV channel commencing in February 2015.  Episode 4, which parodies the Thermomix kitchen implement, has had over 2 million views (as at 17 April 2016).

 Episode 1 – Mexicana Festiana
 Episode 2 – Ethical Eating
 Episode 3 – We Quit Sugar
 Episode 4 – Thermomix
 Episode 5 – Food Porn
 Episode 6 – Christmas

Season 2
Season 2 (marketed as Seasoning 2) was picked up by the Australian Broadcasting Corporation (ABC) and a season of 8 episodes was developed to be released through the ABC iview video on demand platform in April 2016. ABC half-funded production for season 2. The episodes were broadcast on free-to-air television.

 Episode 1 – Red Ramen
 Episode 2 – Yummy Mummies
 Episode 3 – It Gets Feta
 Episode 4 – The Body Issue
 Episode 5 – The Cook and The Kates
 Episode 6 – Tying the Not
 Episode 7 – Chienging Flavours (guest starring Ronny Chieng)
 Episode 8 – End of Days

See also
Get Krack!n, a later series by the pair.

References

External links
 Official site
 
 Season 1 on YouTube
 Season 2 on ABC iView

Australian comedy television series
2015 Australian television series debuts
Australian Broadcasting Corporation original programming